

Theodor Schneider (7 May 1911, Frankfurt am Main – 31 October 1988, Freiburg im Breisgau) was a German mathematician, best known for providing proof of what is now known as the Gelfond–Schneider theorem.

Schneider studied from 1929 to 34 in Frankfurt; he solved Hilbert's 7th problem in his PhD thesis, which then came to be known as the Gelfond–Schneider theorem. Later he became an assistant to Carl Ludwig Siegel in Göttingen, where he stayed until 1953. Then he became a professor in Erlangen (1953–59) and finally until his retirement in Freiburg (1959–1976). During his time in Freiburg he also served as the director of the Mathematical Research Institute of Oberwolfach from 1959 to 1963. His doctoral students include H. P. Schlickewei.

Works
Einführung in die Theorie der transzendenten Zahlen, Springer 1957 (German, French translation 1959)
Transzendenzuntersuchungen periodischer Funktionen, Teil 1,2, Journal für die Reine und Angewandte Mathematik, volume 172, 1934, pp. 65–69, 70-74, online: part 1, part 2 (dissertation in which he solved Hilbert's 7th problem, German)

See also
Schneider–Lang theorem

References
L.-Ch. Kappe, H.P.Schlickewei, Wolfgang Schwarz Theodor Schneider zum Gedächtnis, Jahresbericht DMV, Bd.92, 1990, S.111-129 (German)
Wolfgang Schwarz, Jürgen Wolfart: Zur Geschichte des Mathematischen Seminars der Universität Frankfurt am Main von 1914 - 1970, pp. 29, 82-82, 92-94, 97 (German, ps)

External links

20th-century German mathematicians
1911 births
1988 deaths